Stanwood-Camano School District No. 401 is a public school district in the U.S. state of Washington, serving Stanwood and Camano Island. , the school district enrolls 4,554 students and employs 225 teachers.

Schools

High schools
 Lincoln Hill High School (alternative school)
 Stanwood High School

Middle schools
 Port Susan Middle School
 Stanwood Middle School

Elementary schools
 Cedarhome Elementary School
 Elger Bay Elementary School
 Stanwood Elementary School
 Twin City Elementary School
 Utsalady Elementary School
 Saratoga School (K-12)

References

External links

School districts in Washington (state)
Education in Snohomish County, Washington
Education in Island County, Washington